Svídnice may refer to:

 Svídnice (Rychnov nad Kněžnou District), a village in Hradec Králové Region (Rychnov nad Kněžnou District), Czech Republic
 Svídnice (Chrudim District), a village in Pardubice Region (Chrudim District), Czech Republic
 Schweinitz (river), Czech name Svídnice, a river in Bohemia (Czech Republic) and Saxony (Germany)
 Świdnica, Czech name Svídnice, a city in south-western Poland